Lycée Jean Jaurès is a senior high school/sixth-form college in Châtenay-Malabry, Hauts-de-Seine, France, in the Paris metropolitan area.

References

External links
 Lycée Jean Jaurès 

Lycées in Hauts-de-Seine
Jean Jaurès